Çiftçi is a Turkish surname. Notable people with the surname include:

 Batuhan Çiftçi (born 1997), Turkish amateur boxer
 Hikmet Çiftçi (born 1998), Turkish footballer
 Nadir Çiftçi (born 1992), Turkish footballer
 Serkan Çiftçi (born 1989), Austrian footballer
 Uğur Çiftçi (born 1992), Turkish footballer

Turkish-language surnames